Zeorin is a triterpene with the molecular formula C30H52O2 which occurs in many lichens.

References

Further reading 

 
 
 
 
 

Lichen products
Pentacyclic compounds
Alcohols
Zeorin